Juha Rannikko (born 7 June 1954) is a Finnish sports shooter. He competed in the mixed 50 metre running target event at the 1980 Summer Olympics.

References

External links
 

1954 births
Living people
Finnish male sport shooters
Olympic shooters of Finland
Shooters at the 1980 Summer Olympics
People from Salo, Finland
Sportspeople from Southwest Finland